Rollin C. Edelen (May 17, 1908 – November 27, 1993) was an American businessman and politician.

Born in Brooklyn, Iowa, Edelen went to school in Brooklyn and Hartwick, Iowa. He went to the University of Minnesota. During World War II, Edelen served in the United States Army and was stationed in the Pacific. He owned Estherville Concrete Productions in Estherville, Iowa and was involved in the savings and loan business. From 1971 to 1975, Edelen servein the Iowa House of Representatives and was a Republican. From 1977 to 1981, Edelen served on the Emmet County, Iowa Board of Supervisors. Edelen died in a hospital in Estherville, Iowa. His brother was Walter E. Edelen who also served in the Iowa General Assembly.

Notes

1908 births
1993 deaths
People from Emmet County, Iowa
People from Poweshiek County, Iowa
University of Minnesota alumni
Businesspeople from Iowa
County supervisors in Iowa
Republican Party members of the Iowa House of Representatives
20th-century American politicians
20th-century American businesspeople